The Canadian province of Ontario first required its residents to register their motor vehicles in 1903. Registrants provided their own licence plates for display until 1911, when the province began to issue plates. Plates are currently issued by the Ministry of Transportation of Ontario (MTO). The location of plates is specified by the Highway Traffic Act and Regulation 628 under the Act.

The Crown
The symbol of a crown representing the Crown of Canada has appeared on almost all Ontario licence plates since 1937, when it was first used to commemorate the coronation of King George VI and Queen Elizabeth. Exceptions include the 1951 plates, and farm series plates issued in the 1980s and 1990s. Toronto politician and Orange Order leader Leslie Saunders led protests against a proposal to remove the crown in 1948, a decision the government overturned.

Passenger baseplates

1911 to 1972
The 1954 (dated 1955) issue was the first Ontario licence plate that complied with these standards.

1973 to present
After 1973, Ontario ceased to issue plates annually. Instead, validation was indicated by means of stickers affixed to the top right of the rear plate. All Ontario licence plates issued since 1973 remain valid for display, provided they have been continuously registered.

In 1973, the "Keep it Beautiful" slogan was introduced to Ontario passenger plates. In 1982, the slogan was changed to "Yours to Discover". The adjustment was made to reflect the province's new tourism campaign.

In April 2019, the Government of Ontario announced that the plates would be redesigned. The plates' design includes a surficial laminate layer manufactured by 3M. The plates have a two-tone blue background with white letters and numbers flanking a stylized white trillium, and no longer embossed. The motto was also changed to "A Place to Grow", taking inspiration from Ontario's unofficial anthem "A Place to Stand, a Place to Grow". 

Issue of the new plates began in February 2020. The new plates faced criticism from law enforcement agencies, as their new design made them difficult to read in certain lighting conditions. Concerns were also raised that photo radar systems would have difficulty reading them, due to the lighting issues, as well as the smaller sizing of their "Ontario" text. On February 20, 2020, Premier Doug Ford stated that the government planned to recall the initial batch, and was working with 3M on improvements. However, on May 6, 2020, a spokesperson for Ford announced that the blue plates would be discontinued entirely after "thorough testing by law enforcement and other key stakeholders". The previous white plates were reinstated, with their coating also made more durable, although the blue plates continued to be issued through early-June until their supply was exhausted.

Serial numbers reserved for government officials

Green vehicle plates

Historic vehicles

Historic vehicle license plates were introduced in 1969 as yearly plates. In 1973, plates switched to permanently issued plates validated with stickers.

Vehicles more than 30 years old and substantially unchanged since manufacture may qualify for a "Historic" registration.

Annual fees were much lower ($18 vs $120 for a passenger car until 2022), but historic vehicles may not be used as conventional transportation. They legally may only be driven to and from events and parades where the vehicle is on display, to garages for maintenance, and other similar use cases. Annual renewal stickers are affixed to the rear plate, as with passenger vehicles.

Historic plates are not to be confused with year-of-manufacture plates.

Commercial baseplates

Unlike passenger cars, plate validation stickers for commercial vehicles are placed on the front plate, instead of the rear. This placement is consistent between trucks with visible rear plates, and tractor units where the rear plate is obscured by a trailer. Ontario vehicles registered in the International Registration Plan receive special commercial plates with "PRP" screened vertically at the left.

All pickup trucks are legally considered commercial vehicles and thus require commercial plates. However, if used strictly as a passenger vehicle ("personal-use vehicle"), a truck may be exempt from some conditions imposed on commercial vehicles, indicated by a white or red "PERSONAL USE ONLY" sticker affixed in the top left corner of the front plate.

1916 to 1962
Commercial license plates were first introduced in 1916.

1963 to 1979
In 1963, Ontario switched to a quarterly system for commercial plates. Plates could be issued on a quarterly basis rather than paying for a full year of registration.

1980 to present
In the 1980s, Ontario shifted to plates that were renewed yearly with stickers, ditching the quarterly system.

Prorate plates
Used on vehicles registered in the International Registration Plan (IRP).

Bus plates
Bus license plates were first issued in 1973. They followed the quarterly system until 1980, switching in favour of a new permanent plate renewed yearly with stickers.

{|class="wikitable"
|-
!Image
!Dates issued
!Description
!Slogan
!Serial format
!Serials issued
!Notes
!Usage
|-
|
|1980–1994
|Black reflective on white; "ONTARIO" screened in black at bottom.
||BA1-234
|
|The plate's color is changed to black for this design.
|All bus types
|-
|
|1994–2009
|Black reflective on white; "ONTARIO" screened in black on top.
|"YOURS TO DISCOVER"
|BA1-234
|BA1-001 to BN9-999
|
|Plates designated for use on municipal and long distance busses. Letters G, I, O, Q and U not used in this serial format.
|-
|
|2009–present
|Black on reflective white with screened crown separator
|"YOURS TO DISCOVER"
|123-4BA
|101-1BF to 211-1BM (As of August 24th, 2022)
|
|Plates designated for use on municipal and long distance busses. Letters G, I, O, Q and U not used in this serial format.
|-
|
|1980–1994
|Black on white with embossed crown separator
|none|BP1 234
|BP0 001 to BP1 ??? (As of July 1st, 2019)
|
|Plates designated for use on inter-provincial and long distance coach busses.
|-
|
|1994–present
|Black on reflective white with screened crown separator
|"YOURS TO DISCOVER"
|BP1 234
|BP2 ??? to BP4 805 (As of July 1st, 2019)
|
|Plates designated for use on inter-provincial and long distance coach busses. Letters G, I, O, Q and U not used in this serial format.
|}

School Bus plates
School Bus license plates were first issued in 1975 under a yearly registration. Unlike regular bus license plates, these plates expired in June at the end of the school year. In 1980, these yearly issued plates were phased out for  permanent plates revalidated with stickers annually.

Farm plates

Farm plates were introduced in 1978 using the quarterly system. In 1980, the plates were switched to permanent plates revalidated with stickers.

Vehicles over 3000 kg owned by farmers and used for farm-related purposes, such as working the soil, building maintenance, and the transportation of farm products, may qualify for a farm plate. Farm-plated trucks and towed trailers may also be used by a farmer for personal transportation.

To qualify, a farmer must meet a series of criteria, including membership in farming organisations and a minimum amount of income that derives from farming. Fees for farm plates are substantially lower than for passenger or commercial plates. The Highway Traffic Act also exempts farm vehicles from several requirements imposed on commercial vehicles.

Farm plates are black on white with a black crown separator, in a pattern similar to commercial plates. They have the word "FARM" written vertically on the left of the plate. Validation stickers are the same as for other vehicles, and are affixed to the front plate, as with commercial plates.

Trailer plates

All trailers in Ontario are considered separate vehicles and must have a permit and be plated. New owners of a trailer must register with the MTO within six days of purchase. They are then issued with a permit and a plate. Trailer plates are not renewed annually, but may be replaced if lost, damaged or stolen. Plates are affixed to the rear of the trailer. There is no front plate.

All trailers, whether used by commercial operators or others, use a same model plate. Plates are blue on white with crown separator, in a pattern and colour similar to that of passenger vehicles, with the word "TRAILER" written vertically on the left of the plate. However, they do not follow the same numbering system as other vehicles.

1921 to 1973
Trailer plates were first introduced in 1921. Plates issued from 1921 to 1929 had the letter T at the front. In 1930, the letter T was moved to the end of the number. A quarterly system was introduced for trailers starting in 1963.  

1973 to present
By 1973, the quarterly system was phased out in favour of a semi-permanent plate validated each year with an annual sticker. As of 1980, trailer plates no longer require yearly validation stickers, rather a one time fee. 

Motorcycle vehicle plates
Motorcycle plates were first issued in 1911. Issued yearly until 1980 when they switched to yearly renewal with validation stickers.

1911 to 1980

1980 to present

Off-Road Vehicle plates
These license plates are issued to ATVs and other vehicles for off roading uses.

Moped plates

Snowmobile plates

Unlike all Ontario license plates — which were changed to reflective plates in 1994 — the snowmobile plates remain non-reflective.

Dual purpose plates
Dual purpose license plates were first introduced in 1927. They were issued to vehicles that could be used for both personal and commercial purposes. Vehicles such as RV's, station wagons & motor-homes. They were noted by the X prefix. However, these plates were discontinued in 1973 and are no longer issued.
1927 to 1972

Diplomatic plates

In Ontario, diplomatic plates were first issued in the 1950s. The first red licence plate was issued in 1959. Yearly plates were issued until 1986, when permanent plates renewed with stickers were introduced the following year. The ABC-123 serial format began in 1973.

The current design is a white serial on red plate, using the 123-ABC serial format. "YOURS TO DISCOVER" is screened at the bottom. The red plate colour is exclusive to diplomatic plates.

Any foreign representatives and their accredited family members are required to obtain special red diplomatic licence plates when registering passenger vehicles within 30 days of taking up residence in the province. This rule does not apply to the registration of motorcycles.

These plates are most commonly found in Ottawa and Toronto where embassies and foreign government operations are located.

Dealer and service licence plates

In Ontario, motor vehicle dealers licensed under the Motor Vehicle Dealers Act'' use a single portable plate with the word "DEALER" on the left side and red alpha-numeric characters on a white background. It is for exclusive use by motor vehicle dealers only on motor vehicles owned as part of the dealer's inventory of vehicles for sale. It may also be used for private use vehicles that are owned as part of the dealer's inventory of vehicles for sale.

Service providers, including anyone who repairs, customizes, modifies, manufactures or transports motor vehicles or trailers use yellow and black DLR series plates (Dealer and Service Plate).

A service plate may be used:

 on a trailer or motor vehicle other than a motorcycle or motor-assisted bicycle for purposes related to the repair, road testing, customization or modification of the vehicle, if the vehicle is in the possession of the person to whom the service plate is issued, or
 for the purpose of transporting the vehicle by a person engaged in the business of transporting vehicles, or
 for purposes related to the manufacturing or sale of a trailer, or
 for the purpose of towing the vehicle by a person engaged in the business of transporting vehicles, or
 to tow a vehicle to a location where its load will be removed or to an impound facility.

Private use of motor vehicles or trailers with a service plate is not permitted.

Motorcycle Dealer plates

Dealer plates for motorcycles have been issued since the 1920s. Very few of these early plates were issued, thus making it a rare plate. The 'M' prefix was featured on all plates before 1973. From 1973 to 1979 they were issued with the 'DL' prefix, with a similar design to regular Motorcycle plates. In 1982, the government began issuing permanent plates with yearly registration stickers. Reflective plates were introduced in 1994.

The current plate design is a white serial on a light blue plate. These plates are the same size as regular motorcycle plates. The serial format used by these plates is AB123, running from AA001 to AF965 (As of September 12th, 2022)

Other non-passenger plates

Medical doctor plates

Medical doctor plates were first introdcued in 1930.

Amateur radio plates
Amateur Radio plates were introduced in 1969 as supplemental plates. In 1976, Ontario permitted the call-sign to be on regular passenger plates, eliminating the small supplemental plates.

Special Event Plates

Vanity licence plates
Along with regular series plates, the province also offers vanity plates for passenger and commercial vehicles. A personalized licence plate message may contain almost any combination of letters and numbers from two to eight characters. The plates can also include one of 60 different graphics, with two to six characters. Available graphics have changed over the years, with some becoming available, while others have been withdrawn or modified. Owners selecting a graphic but no custom message are generally assigned a registration with a 12XY34 pattern, where the XY is a code indicating the design (i.e.: LN and LM = Loon, CF = Canadian Flag, etc.).

The province reserves the right to refuse or withdraw plates for a variety of reasons, including:
 Sexual messages
 Abusive, obscene language and derogatory slang
 Promotion or denunciation of religion and religious figures
 Promotion of use of drugs or alcohol
 Messages relating to politics, political figures, negative statements on institutions and persons, public personalities, or police badge numbers
 Advocating or promoting violence or crime
 Any discriminatory statement
 Ambiguous or confusing numbers, or which may be mistaken for another existing plate (about 1 in 3 rejections)
 Messages which may infringe on copyright and intellectual property
While criteria have existed since the introduction of personalized plates, accusations of excessive zeal led the McGuinty government to set up a review committee in August 2008. The eight-member committee meets weekly to review submissions.  In the first half of 2013, it had rejected 3% of requests. Plates have also been withdrawn after issue.

The COVID-19 pandemic of 2020 brought renewed attention to the work of the Personalized License Plate Review Committee as it rejected personalized plates based on this theme.

The ownership of plates with graphic elements associated with particular groups, such as veterans or firefighters, may be restricted and require proof of eligibility.

Personalized plates with two to five characters are also available for motorcycles.

Veteran Plate

License Plate Graphics

Plates with graphics are also available. Graphics first being issued on license plates began in 1996. The variety of graphics includes charities, universities, community organizations and popular Ontario sports teams, such as the Ottawa Senators. All plates offer the French slogan since 2017.

Discontinued Graphics
Certain graphics have been discontinued and are no longer issued. A plate design is considered discontinued once it is no longer offered at ServiceOntario.

Manufacturing

Ontario licence plates were formerly manufactured by prison inmates at the Millbrook Correctional Centre in Cavan-Millbrook-North Monaghan.  Upon Millbrook's closure in 2003, manufacture was moved to the Central East Correctional Centre in Lindsay, Ontario.  Since 1991, all Ontario plates have been manufactured for the MTO by Trilcor Industries, owned by the province's Ministry of the Solicitor General. From 2017 to 2018, the plates were manufactured by Waldale Manufacturing of Nova Scotia, because Ontario's prison made plates ran out due to the peeling and bubbling in the preceding "B" series. The plates made by Trilcor Industries returned in 2018, to avoid license plate issues with the Nova Scotia license plates.

Alternative supplier
In 2016, an increase in the rate of defective plates combined with an increase in the number of registered vehicles led to the Ontario Ministry of Transportation becoming unable to keep up with demand for plates. It placed an order for 100,000 units from the Waldale Irwin Holdson Group, the largest licence plate manufacturer in North America. Plates are produced by the Waldale Manufacturing facility in Amherst, Nova Scotia.

Plates from the first batch of 35,000 can be identified due to the use of embossed letters and numbers from Nova Scotia plates, which differ in appearance from Ontarian fonts. The province continues to order supplementary batches of plates from Waldale. Since 2017, the Ontario die set has been in use. These plates are almost identical to those made by Trilcor Industries. The Waldale made plates have squared off edges and smaller bolt holes.

Issues and controversies

Defective plates from 2012
In 2012, reports began to appear of plates deteriorating earlier than otherwise expected. The reflective layers detached themselves from the metal plate, making the plate unreadable. Approximately 1% of licence plates issued have this defect. The defect has appeared in both front and rear plates. Trilcor Industries and the MTO offer a five-year warranty on plates and will replace the defective plates at no cost. Plate replacement for other reasons (theft, damage, wear, etc.) is done at a cost.

Conventional plates can be replaced "over-the-counter" at a licence office, but the complete process for personalized plates takes over six months.

Driving with an illegible plate is an offence punishable by fine, under the Highway Traffic Act.

In 2015, the Ministry of Community Safety and Correctional Services hired Canada's National Research Council to identify the root cause of licence plate de-lamination. The NRC's report indicated that the reflective material adhered poorly to the aluminium plates, and that embossing process stressed the materials to the point that the reflective layer would puncture and de-laminate. At that point, water and other contaminants could slip between the layers. Also, road de-icing materials contributed to the de-lamination. The report found that this problem was present in samples from all types of plates, except for motorcycle plates.

The report recommended that Trilcor work with its supplier of laminating layer to resolve the problem, and indicated that a thicker layer of material would likely perform better.

Illegality of licence plate covers 
Many vehicle owners place clear plastic covers over their licence plates to protect their already defective licence plates (2012) from premature deterioration. According to Ontario's Highway Traffic Act Section 13.2, licence plate covers are considered an obstruction and are illegal in the province of Ontario. In the rare event that the officer chooses to issue the citation, the offence carries a minimum fine of $85. On the contrary, drivers operating a motor vehicle with defective (i.e. unreadable) number plates can be charged with the same offence. This has left defective number plate owners with little choice but to obtain replacement plates from the MTO, orders which have taken months (or over six months for customised plates) to process.

Several motorists sought other solutions to prevent their number plates from deterioration, such as placing the front plate on the dashboard instead of affixing it to the front bumper. Others have omitted the front licence plate altogether since it is not uncommon to see out-of-province vehicles on Ontario roadways (many jurisdictions in North America do not require front plates). In most cases, vehicle owners who attempted the aforementioned solutions were convicted of the same offence (HTA section 13.2).

Defective plates from 2020

On 15 February 2020, two weeks after the province began issuing plates with the new design, off-duty Kingston Police Sergeant Steve Koopman posted a photo on Twitter showing a vehicle with the new plate at night, stating that "they're virtually unreadable at night". Government spokesperson Lisa Thompson, the Minister of Government and Consumer Services, stated in a news conference that the new design had undergone a "rigorous testing program", that the government had consulted with "key stakeholders" including law enforcement, and that the plates were not problematic. She also criticized the earlier "Liberal plates", referring to a batch of plates issued during a previous government that peeled. Thompson stated that manufacturing and quality control are the responsibility of 3M. The redesigned plates also caused problems for photo radar cameras, which have difficulty reading the name of the jurisdiction. The name is rendered in a smaller font size than earlier plates. The president of the Toronto Police Association stated that the organization had not been consulted on the new design.

The Ford Government had insisted for days that there was not an issue with the plates; however, on February 20, it announced that 3M would make an "enhanced licence plate" to be available in less than three weeks. On February 28, the government announced that the distribution of the defective plates would cease on March 4, that the enhanced plates would be ready by March 16 at "no cost to Ontario taxpayers", those who had already been issued the new plates will receive the enhanced version in the mail, and until the enhanced plates were ready, the government switched back to the previous plate design. This design was later scrapped on May 6.

Sticker renewal fee
On February 22, 2022, the Ford Government eliminated licence plate renewal fees and the requirement to have a licence plate sticker for the nearly eight million passenger vehicles, light-duty trucks, motorcycles and mopeds, effective March 13, 2022.

See also
Canadian veteran vehicle registration plates
Canadian licence plate designs and serial formats
Vehicle registration plates of Canada

Notes

References

External links
R.R.O. 1990, Regulation 628 which prescribes vehicle registration
Highway Traffic Act, R.S.O. 1990, c. H.8
Ontario licence plates 1969-present

1903 establishments in Ontario
1903 introductions
Ontario
Transport in Ontario
Ontario-related lists